Bidoun is an American non-profit organization, focused on art and culture from the Middle East and its diasporas. Bidoun was founded as a print publication and magazine in 2004 by Lisa Farjam, eventually expanding to curatorial projects. The Bidoun magazine was in publication from spring 2004 until spring 2013.

Magazine
The word "bidoun" in both Arabic and Persian means “without” in English. It is commonly mispronounced and confused with the word Bedouin.

Bidoun was a finalist for the 2009 National Magazine Award for General Excellence (circulation category less than 100k). It has won three Utne Independent Press Awards, for Social/Cultural Coverage and Design.

Magazine contributors
Notable contributors to the magazine include: Etel Adnan, Tirdad Zolghadr, Pankaj Mishra, Binyavanga Wainaina, Eyal Weizman, Tony Shafrazi, Jace Clayton, Thomas Keenan, Naeem Mohaiemen, Yto Barrada, Bruce Hainley, Hampton Fancher, Gini Aldaheff, Elizabeth Rubin, Yasmine El Rashidi, Shirana Shahbazi, Hassan Khan, Akram Zaatari, Michael Rakowitz, Natascha Sadr Haghighian, Elias Muhanna, William E Jones, Rokni Haerizadeh, Christopher Hitchens, Shumon Basar, Farhad Moshiri, Lawrence Weiner, Mohamed Mrabet, Slavs and Tatars, George Pendle, Wayne Koestenbaum, Issandr El Amrani, Fatima Al Qadiri, Sophia Al Maria, Ahdaf Soueif, Gary Dauphin, Kai Friese, Sharifa Rhodes-Pitts, Paul Chan, Anna Boghiguian, Lynne Tillman, Haris Epaminonda, Iman Issa, Ken Okiishi, Fawwaz Traboulsi, Achal Prabhala, Youssef Rakha, Sahar Mandour, Lawrence Osborne, Lina Mounzer, Rasha Salti, Okwui Enwezor, Namwali Serpell, Robyn Creswell, and Christopher de Bellaigue.

The contributing editors of Bidoun were Alexander Provan, Anna Della Subin, Anand Balakrishnan, Aram Moshayedi, Kaelen Wilson-Goldie, Shumon Basar, Sohrab Mohebbi, Sophia Al Maria, Sukhdev Sandhu and Yasmine El Rashidi.

Bidoun art and culture projects 
The Bidoun Library Project is an itinerant exhibition that “documents the innumerable ways that people have depicted and defined — that is, slandered, celebrated, obfuscated, hyperbolized, ventriloquized, photographed, surveyed, and/or exhumed — the vast, vexed, nefarious construct known as ‘the Middle East.’" The Bidoun Library, which consists of roughly 3,000 books and periodicals, has been exhibited in Pittsburgh at the Carnegie International, in New York at the New Museum, in London at the Serpentine Galleries, in Cyprus at the Point Centre for Contemporary Art, in Beirut at 98weeks, in Cairo at The Townhouse Gallery, in Stockholm at the Tensta Konsthall, in Abu Dhabi at Abu Dhabi Art, and in Dubai at Art Dubai.

In 2009, Bidoun organized the group exhibition 'NOISE' at Sfeir–Semler gallery in Beirut featuring Vartan Avakian, Steven Baldi, Walead Beshty, Haris Epaminonda, Media Farzin, Marwan, Yoshua Okon, Babak Radboy, Bassam Ramlawi, Mounira Al Solh, Andree Sfeir, Rayyane Tabet, Lawrence Weiner, and Alessandro Balteo Yazbeck. That same year Bidoun initiated a collaboration with the web-based archive UbuWeb in order to make available rare video and sound pieces from in and around the Middle East.

'Forms of Compensation' was a 2010 exhibition of a series of 21 reproductions of iconic modern and contemporary artworks produced in Cairo by craftspeople and auto mechanics in the neighborhood around the Townhouse Gallery, commissioned by Babak Radboy and overseen by Ayman Ramadan.

In 2015, Bidoun occupied a booth at the Frieze Art Fair in New York where it exhibited and sold insignificant objects from artists. Inspired by the celebrity collectibles market, where a Justin Bieber hairball sold at auction for $40,668, Bidoun extended this covetous logic to the rarified realm of art, proffering such miscellanies as Jeremy Deller's iPod Mini, Lawrence Weiner's gold tooth, Hans-Ulrich Obrist’s abused passport, and a 1638 edition of Burton’s The Anatomy of Melancholy defaced by Orhan Pamuk. Other items included Tony Shafrazi’s prescription drugs, a rock signed by Robert Smithson, Douglas Gordon’s house keys, Yto Barrada’s third grade report card, Hal Foster’s breath mints, Cindy Sherman’s eyeliner, Tala Madani’s body lotion, Wade Guyton’s Nikes, Anicka Yi’s brain, Julie Mehretu’s golf ball, Bjarne Melgaard’s Christmas card from a serial killer, Laura Owens’ bus pass, Shirin Neshat’s kohl, a stuffed animal once owned by the great Iranian modernist Bahman Mohasses, and Darren Bader’s junk mail.

In 2016, Bidoun programmed a screening series at the Solomon R. Guggenheim Museum, organized by Tiffany Malakooti.

Publications

Books 
Bidoun has edited, published and co-published several books including:
 WITH/WITHOUT Spatial Products, Practices and Politics in the Middle East, Edited by Shumon Basar, Antonia Carver and Markus Miessen (Bidoun/Moutamarat, 2007) 
 Provisions | Sharjah Biennial 9: Book 1, Edited by Antonia Carver, Valerie Grove and Lara Khaldi (Bidoun/Sharjah Art Foundation, 2009) 
 Provisions | Sharjah Biennial 9: Book 2, Edited by Antonia Carver and Lara Khaldi (Bidoun/Sharjah Art Foundation, 2010)
 Further Reading (Bidoun, 2011)
 Here and Elsewhere, Edited by Kaelen Wilson-Goldie and Negar Azimi (New Museum, 2014)

Issues and themes 

 Issue 00: We Are You
 Issue 01: We Are Spatial
 Issue 02: We Are Old
 Issue 03: Hair
 Issue 04: Emirates Now
 Issue 05: Icons
 Issue 06: Envy
 Issue 07: Tourism
 Issue 08: Interviews
 Issue 09: Rumor
 Issue 10: Technology
 Issue 11: Failure
 Issue 12: Projects
 Issue 13: Glory
 Issue 14: Objects
 Issue 15: Pulp
 Issue 16: Kids
 Issue 17: Flowers
 Issue 18: Interviews
 Issue 19: Noise
 Issue 20: Bazaar
 Issue 21: Bazaar II
 Issue 22: Library
 Issue 23: Squares
 Issue 24: Sports
 Issue 25: Egypt
 Issue 26: Soft Power
 Issue 27: Diaspora
 Issue 28: Interviews

Quotes
"Bidoun emerged at just the right time as the world looked at the Middle East through the singular lens of failure. The magazine is smart and irreverent in all the right ways." —Ahdaf Soueif

"Bidoun’s editorial voice might be described as a combination of Artforum and Harper's, its audience comprising artists, academics, and intellectually curious readers who enjoy a magazine that manages to dissect Edward Said and Michael Jackson in the same issue." —Print magazine

References

External links 
 
 Interview with Bidoun in Kaleidescope Magazine

2004 establishments in New York (state)
Alternative magazines
Visual arts magazines published in the United States
Quarterly magazines published in the United States
Contemporary art magazines
Independent magazines
Magazines established in 2004
Magazines published in New York (state)
Middle Eastern culture
Persian culture
World magazines